Rugosospora is a genus of fungi in the family Agaricaceae. The genus contains two species: R. ochraceobadia, found in Africa, and R. pseudorubiginosa, found in Colombia and Mexico. These species have fruit bodies (mushrooms) with free gills, a white spore print, and a ring on the stipe. Rugosospora was circumscribed by Belgian mycologist Paul Heinemann in 1973.

See also
List of Agaricales genera
List of Agaricaceae genera

References

Agaricaceae
Agaricales genera